The 34th Daytime Emmy Awards, commemorating excellence in American daytime programming from 2006, was held on June 15, 2007 at the Kodak Theatre in Los Angeles, California. CBS  televised the ceremonies in the United States, their last time doing so as of 2017. Meanwhile, Creative Arts Emmy Awards were presented one day earlier on June 14 at the Hollywood and Highland Ballroom.

Nominations for the children's series categories were announced on February 7, 2007. The rest of the nominations were released on March 14.

The "Service Show" award categories were renamed the "Lifestyle" categories. Also a new award for Outstanding Morning Programming debuted. The Creative Arts Awards were held the day before the regular ceremony.

Nominations and winners
The following is a partial list of nominees, with winners in bold:

Outstanding Drama Series
A first-place tie was recorded in this category.

The Bold and the Beautiful
Guiding Light
One Life to Live
The Young and the Restless

Outstanding Lead Actress in a Drama Series
Crystal Chappell (Olivia Spencer, Guiding Light)
Jeanne Cooper (Katherine Chancellor, The Young and the Restless)
Michelle Stafford (Phyllis Summers Newman, The Young and the Restless)
Maura West (Carly Tenney Snyder, As the World Turns)
Kim Zimmer (Reva Shayne, Guiding Light)

Outstanding Lead Actor in a Drama Series
Peter Bergman (Jack Abbott, The Young and the Restless)
Anthony Geary (Luke Spencer, General Hospital)
Ricky Paull Goldin (Gus Aitoro, Guiding Light)
Christian LeBlanc (Michael Baldwin, The Young and the Restless)
Michael Park (Jack Snyder, As the World Turns)

Outstanding Supporting Actress in a Drama Series
Genie Francis (Laura Spencer, General Hospital)
Renée Elise Goldsberry (Evangeline Williamson, One Life to Live)
Rebecca Herbst (Elizabeth Webber, General Hospital)
Lesli Kay (Felicia Forrester, The Bold and the Beautiful)
Gina Tognoni (Dinah Marler, Guiding Light)
Heather Tom (Kelly Cramer, One Life to Live)

Outstanding Supporting Actor in a Drama Series
Trent Dawson (Henry Coleman, As the World Turns)
Dan Gauthier (Kevin Buchanan, One Life to Live)
Rick Hearst (Ric Lansing, General Hospital)
Greg Rikaart (Kevin Fisher, The Young and the Restless)
Kristoff St. John (Neil Winters, The Young and the Restless)

Outstanding Younger Actress in a Drama Series
Julie Marie Berman (Lulu Spencer, General Hospital)
Alexandra Chando (Maddie Coleman, As the World Turns)
Stephanie Gatschet (Tammy Winslow Randall, Guiding Light)
Jennifer Landon (Gwen Norbeck Munson, As the World Turns)
Leven Rambin (Lily Montgomery, All My Children)

Outstanding Younger Actor in a Drama Series
Van Hansis (Luke Snyder, As the World Turns)
Bryton McClure (Devon Hamilton, The Young and the Restless)
Tom Pelphrey (Jonathan Randall, Guiding Light)
Jesse Soffer (Will Munson, As the World Turns)
James Stevenson (Jared Casey, Passions)

Outstanding Drama Series Writing Team
The Bold and the Beautiful
General Hospital
Guiding Light
The Young and the Restless

Outstanding Drama Series Directing Team
As the World Turns
General Hospital
Guiding Light
One Life to Live

Outstanding Game/Audience Participation Show 
Jeopardy!
The Price is Right
Who Wants to be a Millionaire

Outstanding Game Show Host 
Ben Bailey, Cash Cab
Bob Barker, The Price is Right
Pat Sajak, Wheel of Fortune
Alex Trebek, Jeopardy!
Meredith Vieira, Who Wants to be a Millionaire

Outstanding Talk Show 
Dr. Phil
The Ellen DeGeneres Show
Rachael Ray
The Tyra Banks Show
The View

Outstanding Talk Show Host 
Phil McGraw, Dr. Phil
Ellen DeGeneres, The Ellen DeGeneres Show
Rachael Ray, Rachael Ray
Lisa Rinna and Ty Treadway, Soap Talk
Tyra Banks, The Tyra Banks Show
Barbara Walters, Rosie O'Donnell, Joy Behar and Elisabeth Hasselbeck, The View

Outstanding Morning Programming 
A first-place tie was recorded in this category.

Good Morning America
Live with Regis and Kelly
The Today Show

Outstanding Lifestyle Program 
Barefoot Contessa
The Martha Stewart Show
Paula's Home Cooking
Sell This House
This Old House

Outstanding Lifestyle Host 
Cathie Filian and Steve Piacenza, Creative Juice
Emeril Lagasse, Essence of Emeril
Martha Stewart, The Martha Stewart Show
Paula Deen, Paula's Home Cooking

Outstanding Special Class Series 
Animal Rescue with Alex Paen
A Baby Story
Judge Judy
Made
Starting Over

Outstanding Children's Animated Program
Arthur
Curious George
Peep and the Big Wide World
Time Warp Trio
Toddworld

Outstanding Special Class Animated Program 
The Batman
Bigfoot Presents: Meteor and the Mighty Monster Trucks
Growing Up Creepie
Tutenstein

Outstanding Performer In An Animated Program
Jim Conroy (Ruff Ruffman, FETCH! with Ruff Ruffman)
Maile Flanagan (Piggley Winks, Jakers! The Adventures of Piggley Winks)
Eartha Kitt (Yzma, The Emperor's New School)
Danica Lee (Ming-Ming Duckling, Wonder Pets)
Russi Taylor (Fernando "Ferny" Toro, Jakers! The Adventures of Piggley Winks)

Outstanding Pre-School Children's Series 
Hi-5
Hip Hop Harry
It's a Big Big World
The Paz Show
Sesame Street

Outstanding Children's Series 
Assignment Discovery
Endurance: High Sierras
Reading Rainbow
Strange Days at Blake Holsey High

Outstanding Performer In A Children's Series 
A first-place tie was recorded in this category.

LeVar Burton (Himself, Reading Rainbow)
Kevin Clash (Elmo, Sesame Street)
Caroll Spinney (Oscar the Grouch, Sesame Street)

Outstanding Sound Editing - Live Action and Animation
 Timothy J. Borquez, Thomas Syslo, Keith Dickens, Doug Andham, Erik Foreman, Eric Freeman, Mark Keatts, Mark Keefer and Mike Garcia (The Batman)
Robert Hargreaves, Mark Keatts, Mark Keefer and Mike Garcia (Legion of Super Heroes)
Timothy J. Borquez, George Nemzer, Thomas Syslo, Doug Andham, Daisuke Sawa, Keith Dickens, Mark Keatts, Mark Keefer and Mike Garcia  (Loonatics Unleashed)
Blake Norton, Jim Czak, Bill Moss, Bob Schott, Carla Bandini-Lory and Dick Maitland (Sesame Street)
Thomas Syslo, Timothy J. Borquez, Brian F. Mars, Doug Andham, Eric Freeman, Mark Keatts, Mark Keefer and Mike Garcia (Shaggy & Scooby-Doo Get a Clue!)
Daisuke Sawa, Timothy J. Borquez, Thomas Syslo, Doug Andham, Eric Freeman and Mark Keatts  (Xiaolin Showdown)

Outstanding Sound Mixing - Live Action and Animation
Ed Collins, Robert Hargreaves and John Hegedes (Legion of Super Heroes)
Billy Gardner (Reading Rainbow)
Blake Norton, Bob Schott, Jim Czak and Dick Maitland (Sesame Street)
Ed Collins and Doug Andham (Shaggy & Scooby-Doo Get a Clue!)

Lifetime Achievement Award 
Lee Phillip Bell
James Lipton

References

External links
 

034
Daytime Emmy Awards
Daytime Emmy